Francisco Pineda García (born 31 January 1959) is a Spanish retired footballer who played as a forward.

Football career
Born in Málaga, Andalusia, Pineda started playing professionally at La Liga giants Real Madrid. He appeared relatively for the capital club during his five-year spell but, following the signing of Argentine Jorge Valdano and the emergence of youth product Emilio Butragueño, was deemed surplus to requirements – the team also did not win one single national championship in that timeframe – leaving in the 1985 summer.

Pineda subsequently signed for Real Zaragoza, winning the Copa del Rey in his debut season while adding seven goals in the league for the fourth-placed side. From 1988 onwards, however, he suffered greatly with injuries, hardly getting a game at the Aragonese and his following club, hometown's CD Málaga; he retired at the age of 31, immediately after his team's top flight relegation.

Honours
Real Madrid
Copa del Rey: 1981–82
Copa de la Liga: 1985
UEFA Cup: 1984–85

Zaragoza
Copa del Rey: 1985–86

External links

1959 births
Living people
Footballers from Málaga
Spanish footballers
Association football forwards
La Liga players
Segunda División players
Real Madrid Castilla footballers
Real Madrid CF players
Real Zaragoza players
CD Málaga footballers
UEFA Cup winning players
Spain under-21 international footballers
Spain under-23 international footballers
Spain B international footballers